Olga Lomaka (born September 10, 1982) is a Russian gallerist, contemporary artist and curator. Her style is known for working primarily within the pop-art movement, combining diverse materials and techniques in her pieces. Lomaka is actively exhibiting worldwide, participating in global art-fairs and biennales.  She was named the Best Artist of the Year and won The Annual Award at the Aurora European Awards in Moscow in 2014. She was also awarded the title  Fashion Artist of the Year by the Fashion TV Channel in Moscow in 2013.

Early life and education 
Olga Lomaka was born in Krasnodar, Russia. At a young age her family moved to Moscow, where she grew up and spent her childhood. Lomaka moved to the United States in 1999 to continue her higher education and pursue her career. In 2002, she completed painting courses at Loyola University Chicago. In 2004 she graduated with honors from the George Mason University, Virginia, with a Business Administration degree. A decade later Lomaka moved to London to pursue her interests in art further and established her studio residency in Chelsea. She continued her education in Fine Art at Central Saint Martins and graduated with a BA in Painting from Camberwell College of Arts in 2015, later that year she completed art-business courses at Sotheby’s University of London. In 2017, Lomaka opened Lomaka Gallery in London, a contemporary art space that specializing in featuring emerging artists from all over the world.

Creative career 
As an artist, Lomaka is recognised for her unique pop art style. Within the realms of pop-art, Lomaka examines issues concerning the evolution of social mindfulness, influence of contemporary trends on traditional values, relationships between the sexes and psychological dependence of one’s self esteem on pre-existing stereotypes. At the heart of the artists' work is a blend of global social phenomena and fundamental existential questions. Lomaka always strives to perfect her skills, experimenting with new techniques such as carving and aerography. She mixes traditional materials with modern media. She constantly develops her professional’s skills in the disciplines such as installation art and sculptures, her interests are not limited to painting. Regardless of media, she stays true to her unique and recognisable pop-art style.

Viewers can often find images of famous people in her artworks such as Jude Law, Anna Dello Russo, Karl Lagerfeld, and Naomi Campbell. In October 2016, Lomaka presented an installation dedicated to the 90th birthday of Queen Elizabeth II for her solo show “Artefacts” at Saatchi Gallery in London.

Lomaka’s works can be found in 25 Kadr Gallery Foundation (Moscow), Contemporary Art Center «M17» (Kyiv), Loyola University Foundation (Chicago), Erarta Museum (St.Petersburg) as well as in private collections such as Pierre Cardin’s Foundation.

From 2014 to 2016 she launched her own TV show Art & Fashion with Olga Lomaka on World Fashion Channel, and hosted many guests of the cultural world like Hubert de Givenchy, fashion designer and founder The House of Givenchy, Claire Wilcox, curator of Victoria & Albert Museum, Bernard Blistène, curator of Centre Pompidou and Marta Ruiz del Árbol, curator of Museo Thyssen-Bornemisza.

In 2015, Lomaka launched limited-edition sweatshirts featuring prints from a series of her paintings, Mind Parasites. She has also collaborated with Vogue Fashion Night Out by producing a new collection, Mickey’s Evolution.

In 2017, she founded Lomaka Gallery  set in the heart of London's Fitzrovia. Being an artist and an art collector, Lomaka is truly passionate about supporting artists. Lomaka Gallery is a contemporary art space that collaborates with some of the most distinctive and innovative artists working today. Operating outside conventional practice and the contemporary art system, Lomaka Gallery welcomes a broad audience to an extensive exhibition programme, supporting work of a group of artists who collectively defy categorization.

Solo exhibitions 
Pink Magic, The Hellenic Centre, London, 2018
Artefacts, Saatchi Gallery, London, 2016
Artefacts, 25 Kadr Gallery, Moscow, 2016
The Mind Parasites, Contemporary Art Center M17, Kyiv, 2015
The Mind Parasites, Erarta Gallery, London, 2015
SOS.OK, Contemporary Art Center M17, Kyiv, 2013
SOS.OK, Zeppelin Gallery, Moscow, 2013
SOS.OK, ASC Gallery, London, 2013
Anahata, ASC Gallery, London, 2013
Trip to Ecstasy, Wild Gallery, Paris, 2011
Nerves, 25 Kadr Gallery, Moscow, 2010
Girls Went Wild, Zenith Gallery, Washington, DC, 2004
Saint, LUMA Gallery, Chicago, 2002

Selected group exhibitions 
 2017 — Biennale Internazionale Mantova, Diocesan Museum Francesco Gonzaga, Mantova
 2017 — XI Florence Biennale, Fortezza da Basso, Florence
 2017 — «Premio Combat Prize 2017», Eighth Edition, Museo Civico G. Fattori, Livorno
 2017  — Festival d'Arts chez Pierre Cardin, Lacoste, France
 2017 — «Affordable Art Fair 2017», Hampstead, London
 2017 — «Edition I», Lomaka Gallery, London
 2016 — «Art Monaco 2016», Espace Fontvieille, Monte-Carlo
 2016 — The Art Marathon, IZO Art Gallery, Moscow
 2016 — Russian Art Week, XX International Art Fair, The Central House of Artists, Moscow
 2016 — «ART.WHO.ART» V Edition, Park Mira, Moscow
 2015 — IV Exhibition-Auction, MGIMO, Moscow
 2015 — «LITART», Depre Art Space, Moscow
 2015 — Degree Show, Camberwell College of Arts, London
 2014 — III Exhibition-Auction, MGIMO, Moscow
 2014 — «Circular», Forge Gallery, London
 2014 — «Aurora», Cosmos Pavilion, Moscow
 2014 — «UNIT», Dilston Grove Gallery, London
 2014 — Diamond Auction, Le Sporting Salle Des Etoi Less, Monaco
 2013 — «Re-Ups», Cultivate Gallery, London
 2013 — CRASH SALON, Charlie Dutton Gallery, London
 2013 — End of 1st Year Show, Camberwell College of Arts, London
 2012 — Open Exhibition, Peckham Space Gallery, London
 2012 — Exhibition «0/2», Holiday Art Market, Moscow
 2011 — «Young Generation», Wild Gallery, Paris
 2009 — Exhibition «0/1», 25 Kadr Gallery, Moscow
 2004 — «BEST 04», Fine Arts Galleries at GMU, Fairfax, VA
 2003 — Group Show, George Mason University, Fairfax, VA
 2003 — «Crave», Wilson Center Gallery, Washington, DC
 2002 — Summer Show, Loyola University, Chicago

Awards 
 Painting Nominee, 1st Premio Arte Milano, Milan, 2017
 Best Contemporary Artist 2017, by VV Magazine, Phillips Auction House, London 2017
 Le Prix d’excellence Pensé Écologique», Art Monaco 2016, Monte-Carlo
 First Prize, Sculpture Nominee», Russian Art Week, XX International Art Fair, Moscow, 2016
 Best  Art Programme  of  the  Year, by Fashion TV Channel, Moscow, 2015
 The  Best  Artist  of  the  Year, The Annual Award by Aurora European Awards, Moscow, 2014
 2014 — «The  Best  Artist  of  the  Year»,  The Annual Awards by Top  25  Diamond  Companies &  Persons, St. Petersburg  
 2013 — «Fashion Artist of the Year» by Fashion TV Channel, Moscow

References 

1982 births
Living people
Russian contemporary artists
George Mason University alumni
Russian women curators